Dmytro Yuriyovych Vereitinov (born January 10, 1983) is a Ukrainian former swimmer, who specialized in freestyle events. He currently holds a Ukrainian record of 7:21.42 in the 4 × 200 m freestyle relay at the 2005 FINA World Championships in Montreal, Quebec, Canada. Vereitinov is also a member of SC Ukraina Kharkiv, and is trained by his father and lifelong coach Yuriy Vereitinov.

Vereitinov qualified for two swimming events at the 2004 Summer Olympics in Athens, by clearing a FINA B-cut of 1:52.55 (200 m freestyle) from the European Championships in Madrid, Spain. In the 200 m freestyle, Vereitinov eclipsed his personal best of 1:51.38 to lead the third heat, but finished only in twenty-seventh place from the morning's preliminaries. He also teamed up with Serhiy Fesenko, Serhiy Advena, and Maksym Kokosha in the 4 × 200 m freestyle relay. Swimming the third leg in heat one, Vereitinov recorded a split of 1:50.34, but the Ukrainians settled for sixth place and twelfth overall, in a final time of 7:24.13.

References

External links
 Profile – Swim Ukraine 

1983 births
Living people
Ukrainian male swimmers
Olympic swimmers of Ukraine
Swimmers at the 2004 Summer Olympics
Ukrainian male freestyle swimmers
Sportspeople from Kharkiv